Olipa Chimangeni is a Malawian politician who served as a member of the Malawian parliament for Ntchisi North East. Chimangeni's term began on 2014-05-20.

References

Living people
21st-century Malawian politicians
21st-century women politicians
Members of the National Assembly (Malawi)
Malawi Congress Party politicians
Year of birth missing (living people)
Place of birth missing (living people)